"The Yabba" is a song by American experimental rock group Battles. It was released on August 13, 2015 on Warp Records as the lead single from their third studio album, La Di Da Di. Preceding its commercial release, the song was performed during a live session along with four other songs from La Di Da Di on June 26, 2015. The performance was streamed online in a 24-hour loop on the band's website and was directed by David Raboy.

Music video
The music video for "The Yabba" was released on September 9, 2015 and features the band members playing in various settings. Tom Breihan of Stereogum described the video, saying, "It opens with an image of an unnaturally still woman, in ’70s costume, spinning a basketball on her finger. But the clip mostly focuses on the three members of the band, hard at work, bashing out the song in an outdoor desertscape or surrounded by their own light screens. Sometimes, they’re surrounded by a group of creepily expressionless onlookers." The video was directed by Roger Guàrdia.

Track listing

References

External links
 

2015 singles
2015 songs
Battles (band) songs
Warp (record label) singles